Mr. Christmas may refer to

 Mr. Christmas (Joe Diffie album)
 Mr. Christmas (Brett Eldredge album)
 Mr. Christmas, a character in the Mr. Men book series
 Andy Park (Mr. Christmas), British electrician who claims to have celebrated Christmas Day every day since 1993